Thomas Marston Green Jr. (February 26, 1758 – February 7, 1813) was a Mississippi Territorial politician, planter, and Delegate to the United States House of Representatives during the 7th United States Congress representing the Mississippi Territory.

Early life
Thomas was born to Thomas Marston Green Sr., a future colonel in the Continental Army, and Martha Wills. He was born in Williamsburg, Virginia, on February 26, 1758. In 1782 he moved with his family to Natchez District, Mississippi Territory. He would later move to Fayette, Mississippi, where he would build the Springfield Plantation, and where he would live until his death. The Green family were good friends with Andrew Jackson and Rachel Donelson. Thomas's brother Abraham married Elizabeth Caffery who was the niece of Rachel Jackson. In August 1791, Andrew Jackson and Rachel were married at the Green Family Springfield Plantation. The marriage ceremony was performed by Thomas Green Sr., while Thomas Jr. served as a witness. Andrew and Rachel would later find out that Rachel's divorce was not finalized, at the time of the wedding.

Political life
In 1800 Green was a member of the Mississippi Territory's first General assembly, it was also here where he started making political connections that would lead him to fame. He would also in that time rise to the rank of colonel in the militia. Then on  March 11, 1802 Narsworthy Hunter died, and Green was elected to take his place. On December 6 of that year Thomas was in Washington D.C. to take his place as Mississippi Territory's delegate to the United States House of Representatives. On March 3, 1803, the 7th United States Congress ended, and after 2 months and 25 days in Congress Thomas decided that he would not run for reelection, preferring to retire to the comfort of his Mississippi plantation. After about ten years of retirement, Green died on February 7, 1813, and was buried at the Green Family Cemetery on his plantation.

Family
Thomas married Martha Kirkland on January 15, 1780, with whom he would have ten children.

Joseph Kirkland Green (1780-?) who married Mildred Meriweather Cabell the daughter of Congressman Samuel Cabell.
Elizabeth Green (1783–1862) who married John Alexander Davidson son of General William Lee Davidson.
Martha Wills Green (1783–1808) who married John Hopkins first cousin of General Samuel Hopkins.
Mary Green (1787–1815) who married Charles Burr Howell son of Governor Richard Howell.
Jane Green (1789–1849) who married Archaelaus Kirkland a distant cousin and a descendant of Richard Snowden Kirkland.
Laminda Green (1791–1819) who married Congressman Thomas Hinds.
Rebecca Green (1793-?) who married Dr. Thomas McCoy.
William Marston Green (1796–1829) who married Laura Prince McCaleb.
Filmer Wills Green (1798–1845) who married Emily Hillman McCaleb.
Augusta Green (1801-abt. 1825) who married Jacob Renson Holmes. When Augusta died Jacob married Augusta's niece Martha Howell a grand daughter of Governor Richard Howell

Notes

References
Biographical Directory of the United States Congress, Thomas Marston Greene (Green)
Ewing, Presley Kittredge, Ewing, Mary Ellen Williams; The Ewing genealogy with cognate branches: a survey of the Ewings and their kin in America, Hurcules ptg. & book co., 1919
James, Marquis; Andrew Jackson - The Border Captain, READ BOOKS, 2007,

External links

1758 births
1813 deaths
Delegates to the United States House of Representatives from Mississippi Territory
Members of the Mississippi Territorial Legislature
Mississippi Democratic-Republicans
People from Fayette, Mississippi
Politicians from Williamsburg, Virginia
Virginia colonial people